Barry John Evans (born 10 October  1962) is a former English rugby union wing three-quarter back who played for Leicester Tigers and England.  He was born in Hinckley and educated at John Cleveland College. He won 2 England caps in 1988 against Australia (12 June) and Fiji (16 June).  During his club career, he scored 183 tries for Leicester.

References

External links
 Caught in Time: Leicester Tigers win league title, 1987-88

1962 births
Living people
Leicester Tigers players
English rugby union players
England international rugby union players
Rugby union players from Leicestershire
Rugby union wings